Geoff Todd (born 1950 in Chelsea, Victoria) is an Australian artist and social commentator and has a contemporary figurative style in drawing, painting and sculpture. Geoff Todd works between studios in Winnellie, NT, and Ararat, Victoria.

Geoff Todd's childhood was one on a small dairy farm in certain isolation in Gippsland, Victoria. "For our small family, it was a life constricted by the rigid demands of dairy-farming: we had no television or ready transport, and life was, of necessity, restricted to the immediate landscape. However, for children, such as an environment provided challenges and adventure and, with barely two years between us, my brother Geoff and I were constant companions outside school, traversing the countryside with dogs and bicycles." "The landscape itself had a vitality combined with clarity of line, which reinforced our youthful sense of exploration and discovery; yet even here there was an element of darkness, for the end of World War II was still close enough to be tangible. Both our parents had served in the forces and the house was full of books about the war. These books featured the work of war artists as well as photographs and fifty years later Geoff would seek to replace them, for as well as their obvious impact on childish imaginations, these images continue to resonate through his work. The traces of such early influences surfaces even now in the Victoria Cross Winners series and, more dramatically still, in the blood paintings."

In 1978 Todd's "Book Sculptures" were first exhibited at Powell Street Gallery in Melbourne, they were then re-exhibited at the Victorian Ministry for the Arts in 1980 before he extended the concept to his "Dictionary Paintings" which were exhibited in Christine Abraham's Gallery in 1984 and then re- exhibited in the Victoria House Gallery, London, UK before travelling back to the Museums and Art Galleries of the Northern Territory. At first Todd worked on a concept of using all the actual materials and processes of conventional books but ignored the written content, then he finally worked his way to his "Comic Book Sculpture" which focuses on the story (content) and does not resemble a book in any way. These objects, mostly multiples, he called sculptures. "Using silk screen, etching, wood block prints and collage he has made reproductions of a number of well-known magazines, how-to-draw books, children's story books, and even an illustrated dictionary. Carefully bound and presented they seem at first to be identical with the objects of everyday use but once opened are seen to be quite different." A selection of Todd's book sculptures travelled Australia and the USA in 1978 in the Artists' Books/Bookworks exhibition. ""Books as books, or books as sculptures? I believe that each is the other: but there is a delightful ambiguous presence within the concept. "What happens when you make a portrait of a well-known book or magazine, using paper pages (printed and bound after many copies are made) yet the visual images are not representational? Though the portrait is the same size and format as the original and appropriate colours are used, the content is vague. Are such portraits realistic sculptures or simply more books?" 

1994 was a year of public commissions for Todd in the Northern Territory. The newly constructed State Square in Darwin saw Todd's interpretations of Coats of Arms on the facades of the Supreme Court of the Northern Territory and the Northern Territory Parliament House. Within Parliament House he completed the lobby floor stone, brass and steel inlay while a third coat of arms graces the parliamentary chamber. His painterly way of working led to him executing full scale coloured drawings on canvas to work from. Some of these large drawings have been acquired by the Northern territory Museums and Art Galleries' permanent collection, complete with burn marks and scratches suffered during the construction process. 

In 1984, Geoff travelled across Australia to Arnhem Land where he worked with traditional Aboriginal artists. During Geoff Todd's time in the Top End of Australia, the proximity of Indonesia allowed for convenient travel there. His work in Indonesia is in many permanent collections within museums in various Indonesian cities.

"In 1999, Todd held an exhibition at Benteng Vredeberg (The Dutch Fort) in Yogyakarta, Java, which was opened by Prince Prabukusomo (the younger brother to the current Sultan Hamengkubuwono X of Yogyakarta ). The public response to this exhibition established him as a respected artist within Indonesia as well as Australia." Mistik. 9 June 1999. published a cover story. Inilah Partai Pemenang Pemilu (This is the Electoral Winning Party). It appeared that Todd’s exhibition staged at the time of the Indonesian election had put the Sultan of Yogyakarta under some pressure to stand for election. "Opening the exhibition, Prince Prabukusumo, the brother of Java’s spiritual leader, the Sultan of Yogykarta, likened Todd’s work to Raden Saleh and Affandi, the acknowledged masters of 19th- and 20th-century Indonesian art. The paintings were a surprise for me because Geoff Todd is a foreigner and he captured the spirit of the son of my great-great-grandfather," Prabukusumo told the Bulletin. "Indeed, the overwhelming public interest in Todd's exhibition is a reflection of renewed interest in the warrior hero whose uncorrupted leadership qualities are sought like never before. As the first free election in more than three decades is due to take place on 7 June, Todd's work highlights many of the characteristics voters will be searching for among the candidates. "We want someone like Diponegoro. Someone clean and daring" explains (Indonesian artist) Ardiyanto Pranata". Many believed Hamengku Buwono X was the man.

Geoff Todd is an artist whose strong figurative work reveals intimate, personal and sometimes erotic connections with his subjects, while pursuing broader themes.
"In a career spanning over forty years Geoff Todd's practice has consistently expressed his commitment to social justice and activism, while also reflecting his responses to wider political issues ranging from the so-called 'Bali Nine' arrests in 2005, to September 11, 2001 terrorist attacks. These have also, quite often conflicted with Todd's innate modesty, and his (unwarranted) concern that they might be perceived as grandstanding or in someway manipulative."
Inspiration for Todd is found across a wide spectrum, but whether concerning himself with simple nude studies  to a portrait of Judas, Todd tends to evoke some feeling. Of his portrait of Judas, Gubar writes "Todd's image emphasizes guilt, remorse, a conviction about one's own worthlessness. Less a demon, more a monk or mendicant, a hopeless Judas atoning in desolate silence clarifies how it feels to be John's son of perdition, an anathema."

Figurative art led Todd to pursue the challenge of translating three-dimensional form into two-dimensional drawing and painting. In doing this he always chooses to work from life, believing that to work from a photograph is allowing the camera to do the difficult work. While he understands the importance of the finished image produced and arriving at this result is different roads for different people, personally he enjoys the conservative idea of hand and eye coordination and experimenting with line to describe 3D illusion on 2D surfaces. He argues for honesty to oneself and suggests the landscape, a still life or even animals allow for a bit of fudging, so he spends much time working from the nude model. Todd writes "Why the Nude? To be confident in drawing (as opposed to the quaint idea of "mark making") one does need to be able to draw - that is, to make the mark go where it is wanted. And this can be learned - but of course, it must be remembered, that a lot of fine "drawers" are not necessarily fine "artists"." 
The Darwin gallery, Framed chose to feature Todd's work for their closing exhibition after thirty years. This solo show along with the accompanying book, "Reflections" revealed thirty years of the artist's work and his thought processes. He has continued to defend the idea that while minor accidents may occur in art works to fine effect, the artist really needs to be in overall control of his/her work to be able to call it Art. "Having a need to draw sometimes causes one to look harder. "What will I draw?" is more easily answered when an artist is looking, not just thinking. After all, we are called Visual Artists."

Education and employment 
Graduate Diploma Visual Arts, Gippsland Institute of Advanced Education, (Now Monash University)
Diploma in Fine Arts, Bendigo Institute of Technology, (Now La Trobe University)
Diploma in Technical Teaching, Hawthorn Institute of Technology, (Now University of Melbourne)

During the 1970s and 1980s Todd worked as an art teacher in Victorian State Technical schools, Tottenham, Mooroolbark,Shepparton and Monterey. In 1980 while working at Monterey Secondary College, Geoff Todd took leave to complete a half year residency at the Victorian College of the Arts in Melbourne, Victoria before heading to Maningrida in Arhnemland in the Northern territory of Australia in 1984 where he worked as craft Adviser.
After leaving Maningrida in 1987, Todd worked at Batchelor Institute as an Art Lecturer in Rum Jungle Northern Territory, before working part-time as a Sculpture Lecturer at Charles Darwin University, which is also in the Northern Territory.

2019 Member of the Order of Australia (AM) in the Australia Day Honours for "significant service to the visual arts as an artist and sculptor".

Other work

Book design & illustration

Barnaby, Jane, Mountain Cattlemen, Oxford University Press, Melbourne 1982. [designer] 

Barnett, Gillian, The Inside Hedge Story, Oxford University Press, Melbourne 1981. [illustrator] 

Dowling, Carolyn & McCracken, Noelle, The Book of Melbourne, Oxford University Press, Melbourne, 1983,

[designer & illustrator] p. 9-10, 14-19, 28-32, 69 

Epstein, June, When Tracey Came For Christmas, Oxford University Press, Melbourne, 1982. [illustrator] 

McCracken, Noelle & Taylor, Brent, The Truck Driver, Oxford University Press, Melbourne, 1983. [designer] 

What Rubbish!, Oxford University Press, Melbourne, 1982, [designer] 

Zable, Arnold, Clown Boy, Oxford University Press, Melbourne, 1982. [designer] 

The River Man, Oxford University Press, Melbourne, 1982. [designer] 

Lindsey, Tim & Pausacker, Helen (Eds)
Religion, Law and Intolerance in Indonesia,
Routledge, Oxford, 2016 

Lindsey Tim & Nicholson, Penelope,
Drugs Law and Legal Practice in South East Asia: 
Indonesia, Singapore and Vietnam,
Hart Publishing, Oxford 2015 

Murphy, Brian, Gangelhoff, Puffin Books, Ringwood, 1986. [Illustrator]

Publications & catalogues

Carmon, Odelia & Todd, Geoff D, I Came Down To Earth, Saray Publishing, Sydney, 2001 

Città di Firenze, Biennale Internazionale Dell'Arte Contemporanea, Settima Edizione 2009,p. 578-579 florence biennale past editions

Christies, Australian, International & Contemporary Paintings, Christies Australia, South Yarra, 2005, p. 172

Germaine, Max, Artists and Galleries of Australia, Third Edition (Revised and enlarged), Craftsman House, Roseville, (1984) 1990, Vol. 2, p. 677 -78. 

Gubar, Susan, Juda: A Biography, W.W. Norton & Co, New York, 2009, p. 252, 254-55. 

Healy, Jacqueline, " Geoff Todd: War Heroes, Portraits of Victoria Cross Winners & A Protest in Blood", Bundoora Homestead Gallery, Bundoora, 2001

Levitt, Stewart A, & Todd, Geoff D, (with Carmon, Odelia & Overby II, Rodney) Psalms For The Secular: A Collaboration Between Stewart Levitt and Geoff Todd,

Saray Publishing, Sydney, 2005, 

Lindsey, Tim & Hines, Toby (Eds)
Looking North- The Art of Geoff Todd: Outsider, Maverick, Humanist,
Zebu Press, Hawthorn East, 2005 

Lucas, Janette (Ed) Geoff Todd: Beautiful Beasts, Sprout Creative, Darwin 2016 

McCulloch, Alan (Ed.)
"MPAC 10th Anniversary Exhibition"' Mornington Peninsula Arts Centre
Mornington, Victoria, 1979, p. 10.
http://trove.nla.gov.au/work/32484891?selectedversion=NBD41760748

McCulloch, Alan, (w/McCulloch, Susan)
The Encyclopaedia of Australian Art,
(Revised & Updated), Allen & Urwin, (1968) 1994, p. 702
https://www.allenandunwin.com/browse/books/general-books/visual-arts/Encyclopedia-of-Australian-Art-Alan-Sue-McCulloch-9781863733151

McCulloch, Alan, McCulloch, Susan & McCulloch Childs, Emily (Eds)
The New McCulloch's Encyclopaedia of Australian Art,
Australian Art Editions/The Miegunyah Press, Fourth Edition, (1968) 2006, p,957
http://trove.nla.gov.au/work/9035129

McCullough, Thomas G (Ed.)
The First Australian Sculpture Triennial, La Trobe University/ Danforth Press,
Melbourne, 1981, p. 164 & 272
http://trove.nla.gov.au/work/21213706?selectedversion=NBD2595661

Mendham, Dawn
about/Territory_picture_show_30_September_26_November "Territory Picture Show", Museum and Art Gallery of the Northern Territory,
(MAGNT), Fannie Bay, Northern Territory, 1995. [unpaginated]

Mendham, Dawn & West, Margie, 
Contemporary Territory, Museum & Art Gallery of the Northern Territory,
Darwin, 1994, p. 52-55.
Contemporary Territory (MAGNT) 1994

Murray, Daena,
The Sound Of The Sky, Museum & Art Gallery of the Northern Territory/Charles Darwin University Press,
2006, p. 135-36, 145,150
"The Sound Of The Sky: The Northern Territory in Australian Art", Museum & Art Gallery
The Sound Of The Sky (MAGNT)/Charles Darwin University Press 2006

Office of the Administrator Northern Territory, 1999, Northern Territory Chronicle 1974-1998, 

Perkins, Hetty (Ed.)
Crossing Country- The Alchemy of Western Arnhem Land, Art Gallery of New South Wales Publications,
Sydney, 2004, p. 179. 
Crossing Country- The Alchemy of Western Arnhem Land, 2004

Todd, Geoff, 3. / Geoff Todd, Zebu Press, 2006 http://trove.nla.gov.au/version/30338806

Todd, Geoff, Artful Drawing from the Nude, OTH Gallery Publication, 2009 

Todd, Geoff, Reflections, Published by Sprout Creative, 2017

Television
Rebgetz, Louisa, "Territory Artist's Playful Exhibition", ABC, "7:30 Report", Darwin,15 June 2012 [5.19 duration]

References 
Bianpoen, Carla, "Geoff Todd depicts 'Ramayana' in paintings", in The Jakarta Post [ Indonesia ], 27 January 2004, p. 19
Burin, Margaret, 'It's a pop life: Leo Sayer launches Geoff Todd's pop art exhibition' , 12 August 2011 http://www.abc.net.au/local/photos/2011/08/12/3292512.htm
Stranger, Lucy, 'Geoff Todd- Beautiful Beasts' Artist Profile 2 March 2016 http://www.artistprofile.com.au/geoff-todd-beautiful-beasts/
Lorimer, Anya, " The Art of Business ", in Territory Q, Issue Three April-June 2014, p.84-88
^Walton, Inga, "Melburnin", in Trouble, Issue 107, November, 2013, p.66-69
Walton, Inga, "War Paint: Protest & Social Activism in the works of Geoff Todd", in Art Monthly Australia" Issue 264, October, 2013, p. 25-29 http://www.artmonthly.org.au/issue-264-october-2013-1
Walton, Inga, " Melburnin", in Trouble, Issue 105, September, 2013, p.52-53
Murray, Elicia & Maddox, Gary, "Well hung painting causes a Stir" 'Stay in touch' The Sydney Morning Herald, 13 May 2008 p. 18.'

20th-century Australian painters
Artists from Melbourne
1950 births
Living people
Members of the Order of Australia
People from Chelsea, Victoria
Monash University alumni
La Trobe University alumni
21st-century Australian painters
University of Melbourne alumni